The 2009–10 season was the 106th season in Schalke 04's history. The team competed in the Bundesliga and DFB-Pokal.

Season summary
Schalke's first season under Felix Magath saw a welcome return to the Champions League after a season's absence.

Players

First-team squad
Squad at end of season

Left club during season

Transfers

In

Kits

Competitions

Bundesliga

League table

DFB-Pokal

Matches

References

Notes

Schalke
FC Schalke 04 seasons